Hillyard Township (T8N R8W) is located in Macoupin County, Illinois, United States. As of the 2010 census, its population was 686 and it contained 330 housing units.

Geography

Demographics

Adjacent townships
 Polk Township (north)
 Brushy Mound Township (northeast)
 Gillespie Township (east)
 Dorchester Township (southeast)
 Bunker Hill Township (south)
 Brighton Township (southwest)
 Shipman Township (west)
 Chesterfield Township (northwest)

References

External links
City-data.com
Illinois State Archives

Townships in Macoupin County, Illinois
Townships in Illinois